The Records Act, also known as an Act to provide for the safe-keeping of the Acts, Records and Seal of the United States, and for other purposes, was the fourteenth law passed by the United States Congress.

The first section of the bill renamed the Department of Foreign Affairs to the Department of State. The next section charged the Secretary of State with receiving legislation from the president for safekeeping. Five subsequent provisions governed the creation, custody and use of the Seal of the United States.

The act also directed the Secretary of State to ensure that every bill enacted or vetoed was published in at least three newspapers, making it the nation's first freedom of information law, though its provisions would later be used to justify the withholding of information from the public.

In 1875, the law was incorporated into 5 U.S.C. section 301, the Housekeeping Statute.

See also
Federal Records Act

References

1789 in American law
1789 in the United States
Acts of the 1st United States Congress
1789 in international relations
Freedom of information in the United States
Freedom of information legislation in the United States
United States federal government administration legislation